There are many medical colleges in Iraq, notably;
University of Koya / School of Medicine, Erbil Governorate, Iraq
University of Wasit / College of Medicine, Wasit Governorate, Iraq
Aliraqi University / college of Medicine, Baghdad, Iraq
University of Duhok / College of Medicine, Dahuk Governorate, Iraq
University of Zakho / College of Medicine, Zakho, Iraq
University of Baghdad / College of Medicine, Baghdad, Iraq
University of Baghdad / Al-Kindy College of Medicine, Baghdad, Iraq
University of Kirkuk / Kirkuk College of Medicine, Kirkuk, Iraq
Al-Nahrain University / College of Medicine, Baghdad, Iraq
Al-Mustansiriya University / College of Medicine, Baghdad, Iraq
University of Mosul / College of Medicine, Nineveh Governorate, Iraq
University of Basrah / College of Medicine, Basra, Iraq
University of Babylon / College of Medicine, Babil Governorate, Iraq
University of Babylon / College of Medicine of Hamorabi, Babil Governorate, Iraq
University of Kufa / College of Medicine, Najaf, Iraq
University of Al-Qadisiyah / College of Medicine, Diwania, Iraq
University of Anbar / College of Medicine, Al Anbar Governorate, Iraq
University of Tikrit / College of Medicine, Saladin Governorate, Iraq
University of Sulaimani / College of Medicine, Sulaimaniyah Governorate, Iraq
Hawler Medical University / College of Medicine, Erbil:
University of Garmian / College of Medicine , Kalar
University of Mosul / Nineva College of Medicine Nineveh Governorate, Iraq 
University of Thi-Qar / College of Medicine, Thi-Qar / Iraq
University of Diyala/ college of Medicine/Diyala

References

Iraq
Medical colleges